A jobsworth  is a person who uses the (typically small) authority of their job in a deliberately uncooperative way, or who seemingly delights in acting in an obstructive or unhelpful manner. It characterizes one who upholds petty rules even at the expense of effectiveness or efficiency.

"Jobsworth" is a British colloquial word derived from the phrase "I can't do that, it's more than my job's worth", meaning that to do what is requested of them would be against what their job requires and would be likely to cause them to lose their job. The Oxford English Dictionary defines it as "A person in authority (esp. a minor official) who insists on adhering to rules and regulations or bureaucratic procedures even at the expense of common sense." Jonathon Green similarly defines "jobsworth" as "a minor factotum whose only status comes from enforcing otherwise petty regulations".

An example of the phrase in its original context in the 1965 Beatles movie Help!, when Roy Kinnear's character, the assistant scientist  Algernon, exclaims "Well it's more than my job's worth to stop him when he's like this, he's out to rule the world...if he can get a government grant."

An example of the term in its fully formed metaphorical use was by UK folk-singer Jeremy Taylor, in a song he wrote in the late 1960s:

The term became widespread in vernacular English through its use in the popular 1970s BBC television programme That's Life! which featured Esther Rantzen covering various human interest and consumer topics. A "Jobsworth of the Week" commissionaire's hat was awarded each week to "a startling tale of going by the book".

The term remains in use, particularly in the UK, to characterise inflexible employees, petty rule-following and excessive administration, and is generally used in a pejorative context.

See also

 Apparatchik
 Clientelism
 Computer says no
 Malicious compliance
 Quiet quitting
 Work-to-rule

References

Pejorative terms for people
British slang
Human resource management
Public administration
Waste of resources